NGC 141 is a lenticular galaxy in the constellation of Pisces. Discovered by Albert Marth on August 29, 1864, it is about 525 million light-years away and is approximately 100,000 light-years across.

References

External links 
 

Barred spiral galaxies
0141
Astronomical objects discovered in 1864
Pisces (constellation)